Tai Wai Tsuen may refer to several places in Hong Kong:
 Tai Wai Tsuen, the original village of Tai Wai, Sha Tin District
 Tai Wai Tsuen (Yuen Long District), a village in the Yuen Long Kau Hui and Shap Pat Heung areas of Yuen Long District